Earhart or Earhardt is a surname. Notable people with the surname include:

 Ainsley Earhardt (born 1976), American television personality and author
 Amelia Earhart (born 1897; disappeared 1937), American aviation pioneer and author
 Daniel S. Earhart (1907–1976), U.S. Representative from Ohio
 Fred A. Earhart (1875–1948), acting mayor of New Orleans for one day on July 15, 1936
 Harry Boyd Earhart (1870–1954), American business executive and philanthropist
 James Otto Earhart (1943–1999), American murderer
 Ralph Earhart (1923–1997), American football halfback 
 Will Earhart (1871–1960), pioneering American music educator

See also 
 Earheart
 Earnhardt
 Amelia Earhart (disambiguation)